Zärtlichkeiten is the twenty-sixth studio album by Spanish pop artist Julio Iglesias. It was released in 1981.

Track listing
"Mit Tränen in den Augen ist man blind (Hey)" (5:00)
"Ich hab gelacht, ich hab geweint" (3:42)
"Eine Rose, die nie welkt (Por un poco de tu amor)" (2:54)
"Amigo, ich wollt' immer ein Adler sein (Gavilan o paloma)" (4:35)
"Bleib bei mir bis zum Morgen (Para que no me olvides)" (4:02)
"Wo bist Du (Como tu)" (3:31)
"Du bist mein erster Gedanke" (3:54)
"...Aber der Traum war sehr schön (When They Begin the Beguine)" (4:45)
"Wo mein Sonne scheint" (3:23)
"Sie war da (Jurame)" (4:07)

Certifications

References

1981 albums
Julio Iglesias albums
Spanish-language albums